Douglas Livingstone or Doug Livingstone is the name of:

 Douglas Livingstone (poet) (1932–1996), South African poet born in Malaya
 Douglas Livingstone (actor) (1934–2021), English actor; wrote Boys from the Bush TV series
 Doug Livingstone (1898–1981), Scottish footballer and manager